Ahtopol is a town and seaside resort on the southern Bulgarian Black Sea Coast.

Geography

Location 
It is located on a headland in the southeastern part of Burgas Province and is close to the border with European Turkey. It is the southernmost town on the Bulgarian coast. Ahtopol lies within Strandzha Nature Park.

Climate 
Ahtopol has a humid subtropical climate (Köppen climate classification: Cfa) bordering with a mediterranean climate (Csa) with limited continental effects.
Climate chart:

History
The town lies on the site of an ancient Thracian settlement, with the earliest traces of human settlement dating to the Neolithic. It was probably colonized by the Ancient Greeks around 440-430 BC. According to researchers the city was founded by Athenians.
The Romans called it Peronticus, while the Byzantine leader Agathon reconstructed the town after barbarian invasions and possibly gave it his own name, Agathopolis. According to other sources, it was named thus as early as 323 BC. Another name it bore anciently was Aulaiouteichos or Alaeouteichos. Arab geographer al-Idrisi mentions Ahtopol in his memoirs as a remarkable hub and famous city.

In the Middle Ages, the town frequently changed hands between the Byzantine Empire and the Bulgarian Empire. Medieval sources mention Ahtopol as a lively merchant port where many Byzantine, Italian and other ships arrived. With the invasion of the Ottoman troops at the end of the 14th century, the town was called Ahtenbolu. The town ultimately fell under Ottoman rule as late as 1453. An Ottoman tax register of 1498 lists 158 Christian families in Ahtopol, most of which have Greek names but others evidently Slavic (Bulgarian). In 1898, Ahtopol was a town of 410 houses, of which 300 Greek and 110 Bulgarian. In the 19th century, it was still a thriving centre of fishery and overseas trade, with many locals owning their own ships and selling goods all around the Black Sea and the Mediterranean. Viticulture was also well-developed.

Ahtopol has been burnt down and devastated by sea pirates (often the Caucasian Lazi) many times, with the most recent fire being in 1918, when the town was almost destroyed. Remains of the town's fortress (reaching up to 8 m in height and 3.5 m in width), the 12th-century monastery of St Yani and a fountain with a carved horseman are the only traces left from ancient times. Another landmark is the Church of the Ascension from 1796. Ahtopol was a kaza centre in Kırkkilise sanjak of Edirne Vilayet between 1878-1912 as "Ahtabolu" (Ahtopol was referred as Agathoupolis in reference page). Also, Evliya Çelebi passed from here in 1663 and referred as "Ahtabolu" in 6th volume (English of "6. Cilt") of Seyahatname.

After the Balkan Wars, when the area was ceded to Bulgaria by the Ottoman Empire, the town's predominantly Greek population gradually moved to Greece and was replaced by Bulgarian refugees, mostly from Eastern Thrace, specifically Bunarhisar (150 families). The Greek name of the town was Achtòpolis, Αχτοπολις or Agathùpolis, Αγαθουπολις.

Rocketry 
From 1984 to 1990 28 soundings rockets of the Soviet type M-100 were launched near Ahtopol at 42°5'8"N 27°57'17"E.

Honour 
Ahtopol Peak in Antarctica is named after the town.

Notable people 
 professor Kosta Dimitrov Pergelov (1921 – 2007), economist

See also
Ahtopol Peak

References

External links

 Info Ahtopol
 Ahtopol vacation information and pictures

Towns in Bulgaria
Seaside resorts in Bulgaria
Populated places in Burgas Province
Populated coastal places in Bulgaria
Athenian colonies